Trevor Grant may refer to:

 Trevor Grant (cricketer), English cricketer
 Trevor Grant (footballer), Australian rules footballer
 Trevor Ogilvie-Grant, 4th Baron Strathspey, English baron